The 2010 United States Senate special election in West Virginia was held on November 2, 2010. Incumbent Democratic U.S. Senator Robert Byrd died in office on June 28, 2010. Democratic Governor Joe Manchin appointed Carte Goodwin to temporarily fill the vacancy. Goodwin pledged to not run for election to the seat in exchange for the appointment. This was the first open U.S. Senate seat in West Virginia since 1984 and the first in this seat since 1956. Manchin won the open seat and served out the remainder of Byrd's elected term, which ended on January 3, 2013.

Background

Byrd's career 
Byrd had held his seat in the U.S. Senate since 1959, after having served in the House of Representatives since 1953, making him the then-longest-serving person in Congress. Byrd led his party in the Senate from 1977 to 1989, as Majority Leader or Minority Leader. Afterwards, as the most senior Democrat in the Senate, he served as President pro tempore of the Senate whenever his party was in the majority, including at the time of his death. The Democrats held a 59–41 seat majority in the Senate at the time of Byrd's death.

State politics 
West Virginia had not elected a Republican to the U.S. Senate since 1956, but voted Republican in presidential elections since 2000. 77% of voters in the state approved of Democratic governor Joe Manchin, but only 35% approved of Democratic President Barack Obama.

Additionally, the Mountain (Green), Libertarian, and Constitution Parties have been slowly growing forces in the state, hoping to capitalize on discontent from both political parties. All three minor parties fielded ballot-qualified candidates in the 2014 Senate election to fill the open seat of retiring longtime Senator Jay Rockefeller.

Interim appointment 
State law allowed Governor Joe Manchin to make a temporary appointment to the vacant seat. Manchin named a former aide, 36-year-old Carte Goodwin, an attorney and fellow Democrat. Goodwin was sworn in on July 20, 2010, and chose not to run in the special election. Hours later, Manchin announced his intention to seek Byrd's seat.

Timing of the election 
Gov. Manchin urged the West Virginia Legislature to pass legislation scheduling the special election for 2010. Without a revision, West Virginia Secretary of State Natalie Tennant believed that state law would not allow an election to be held until 2012. On July 19, legislators hammered out a compromise bill setting an Aug 28 special primary and Nov 2 special election to elect a senator for the roughly two years and five months remaining in Byrd's term. The bill only changes election law for 2010 and will not apply to other future elections. It also allows a West Virginian who is on the November general election ballot for some other office to also run in the special election.

Democratic primary

Candidates 
 Joe Manchin, incumbent Governor of West Virginia
 Sheirl Fletcher, former Republican State Delegate
 Ken Hechler, former West Virginia Secretary of State and former U.S. Representative

Campaign 
Despite Manchin's very high popularity in the state, he received two politically experienced challengers. Hechler was a former Secretary of State and U.S. Representative, who at the age of 95 campaigned across the state on an anti-mountaintop removal platform. Fletcher was a former Republican member of the House of Delegates.

Results

Republican primary

Candidates 
 John Raese, businessman, nominee for the Senate in 1984 and 2006, and candidate for Governor in 1988
 Harry C. Bruner Jr., attorney
 Kenneth Culp, Vietnam War veteran and accountant
 Albert Howard, candidate in the 2008 New Hampshire Republican presidential primary
 Frank Kubic, epigrammatist author
 Lynette Kennedy McQuain, substitute teacher's aide
 Daniel Scott Rebich, concrete contracting business owner
 Thomas Ressler, retired officer of the Maryland Department of Corrections
 Mac Warner, businessman
 Scott H. Williams, wood products industry supervisor and manager

Campaign 

During the Republican primary campaign, only Raese and Warner released television advertisements.

Results

General election

Candidates 
 Jeff Becker (Constitution Party), West Virginia Constitution Party chairman (campaign site, PVS)
 Jesse Johnson (Mountain Party), lobbyist, freelance writer and lecturer
 Joe Manchin (Democratic Party), incumbent Governor of West Virginia
 John Raese (Republican Party), businessman
 John R "Rick" Bartlett (Write In)
 Charles G. "Bud" Railey (Write In)

Campaign 
Manchin's campaign ads emphasized his support from labor unions and Cecil Roberts (President of United Mine Workers of America), while criticizing Raese for "putting profits before people", supporting the elimination of the minimum wage, and supporting the FairTax. Manchin was endorsed by both the AFL–CIO and the U.S. Chamber of Commerce. Raese was endorsed from numerous anti-abortion PACs and FreedomWorks. Raese criticized Manchin for supporting House Bill 103, which is similar to cap and trade.

Debates 
The first and only debate was held October 18. It featured all four Senate candidates. Raese wanted at least three debates.

Predictions

Polling

Fundraising

Results

References

External links 
 Elections Division at the West Virginia Secretary of State
 2010 Candidate on the Ballot
 U.S. Congress candidates for West Virginia at Project Vote Smart
 West Virginia U.S. Senate – Special Election from OurCampaigns.com
 Campaign contributions from Open Secrets
 2010 West Virginia Senate General Election: John Raese (R) vs Joe Manchin (D) graph of multiple polls from Pollster.com
 Election 2010: West Virginia Senate Special Election from Rasmussen Reports
 West Virginia Senate Special Election, Raese vs. Manchin from Real Clear Politics
 2010 West Virginia Senate Race from CQ Politics
Official candidate sites
 Jesse Johnson campaign website
 Joe Manchin campaign website
 John Raese campaign website

West Virginia 2010
West Virginia 2010
2010 Special
West Virginia Special
United States Senate Special
United States Senate 2010